The HEBA Greek All-Star Game, also known as the EKO Greek All-Star Game for sponsorship reasons, is the All-Star Game of the HEBA (Greek: ΕΣΑΚΕ) Greek professional basketball association for men. It was founded and organized by Gus Sarianides. The men's all-star game has most often been played in a format featuring the Greek All-Stars, versus the Rest of the World All-Stars. There is also a men's slam dunk competition, and a men's 3-point shootout competition. The all-star weekend also features a game between under age 22 players and senior age players (players that are retired professionals), called the Rising Stars versus the All-Time Stars.

Finally, there are also youth 3-point shootout and youth slam dunk competitions, for the age 22 and under players. The all-star weekend previously featured an age 20 and under all-star game, called the Hopes or Youth All-Star Game.

Format

Players from the professional top-tier level Greek Basket League, the professional 2nd-tier level Greek A2 Basket League, and the Greek lower level divisions, are eligible to compete at the All-Star Game's weekend festivities. Normally, only players from the top-tier level Greek Basket League are eligible to compete in the men's all-star game. However, sometimes players from lower level divisions can also play in the men's all-star game, if they are selected on all-star day, during the all-star weekend festivities, as special participants by the coaches of the game, to play in the all-star game.

Such players however, are not considered to be all-star selections, because they are not officially chosen to be all-stars, and because they do not actually play in the top-tier level Greek Basket League, from which the actual all-star selections are chosen. However, players from the lower-tier level Greek divisions can participate in the men's slam dunk and men's 3 point shootout contests.

Logos

History
The Greek All-Star Game was held for the first time on December 31, 1991, and in that first game, "The Rest of the World All-Stars" defeated "The Greek All-Stars", by a score of 133–122. Over the next seven all-star games, the format was "The European All-Stars" versus "The American All-Stars". From 2001 until 2019, the format was the same as the original all-star game was, The Greek All-Stars versus The Rest of the World All-Stars. Since 2001, the Greek All-Star Game is held in various cities in Greece, which is in contrast to the early years of the all-star game, when most of the games were held at either the Peace and Friendship Stadium, or Nikos Galis Olympic Indoor Hall arenas in Athens.

All-Star Game results

Score sheets
1st All-Star Game 1991–92:
DATE: 31 December 1991 
VENUE: SEF  
SCORE: World - Greece 133–122 

TEAM GREECE: (Coach: Michalis Kyritsis): Nasos Galakteros 14, Kostas Patavoukas 10, Minas Gekos 3, Lefteris Subotić 6, Panos Fasoulas 17, Bane Prelević 23, John Korfas 22, Argiris Papapetrou 4, Liveris Andritsos 6, Fanis Christodoulou 9, Dimitris Papadopoulos 2, Nikos Fasouras 6, Nikos Galis (DNP), Panagiotis Giannakis (DNP). 

WORLD TEAM: (Coach: Vlado Djurović): Derrick Hamilton 6, David Ancrum 23, Levertis Robinson 10, Thomas Jordan 14, Antonio Davis 12, John Hudson 16, Melvin Cheatum 2, Ken Barlow 13, Brian Vaughns 19, Edgar Jones 8, Earl Harrison 10.

2nd All-Star Game 1993–94:
DATE: April 10, 1994 (I)
VENUE: SEF 
SCORE: USA - Europe 115–104 

TEAM EUROPE: (Coach: Giannis Ioannidis): Fanis Christodoulou 15, Panagiotis Giannakis 17, Achilleas Demenagas, Žarko Paspalj 23, Angelos Koronios 7, Stavros Elliniadis, Zoran Savić 31, Thodoros Aposkitis, Dimitris Podaras, Georgios Sigalas 7, Georgios Makaras 2, Argiris Papapetrou 2, Nikos Galis (DNP). 

TEAM USA: (Coaches: Michalis Kyritsis / Vangelis Alexandris): Tony White 24, Brent Scott 13, Derrick Chievous 19, Todd Mitchell 10, Henry Turner 11, Lance Berwald 2, Gary Plummer 14, Ed Stokes 0, Mitchell Wiggins, 20.

3rd All-Star Game 1994–95:
DATE: December 22, 1994 (II)
VENUE: SEF 
SCORE: Europe - USA 94–88  

TEAM EUROPE: (Coach: Giannis Ioannidis): Efthimis Bakatsias 3, Georgios Sigalas 6, Panagiotis Giannakis 2, Bane Prelević 9, Tzanis Stavrakopoulos 11, Fragiskos Alvertis 7, Panos Fasoulas 10, Stojko Vranković 20, Nasos Galakteros, Zoran Savić 13, Sasha Volkov 7, Jure Zdovc 6. 

TEAM USA: (Coach: Lefteris Subotić): Melvin Cheatum 6, Chris King, Lance Berwald 2, Travis Mays 6, Eddie Johnson 8, Tony White 25, Mitchell Wiggins 3, Brent Scott 3, Tony Costner 5, Rolando Blackman 9, Thurl Bailey 14, Richard Rellford 4.

4th All-Star Game 1995–96:
DATE: January 6, 1996 (I)
VENUE: OAKA 
SCORE: USA - Europe 124–113 

TEAM EUROPE: (Coach: Lefteris Subotić): Fragiskos Alvertis 16, Georgios Sigalas 20, Panagiotis Giannakis 2, Bane Prelević 7, Nikos Oikonomou 27, Angelos Koronios 7, Stojan Vranković 9, Dinos Angelidis 6, Lefteris Kakiousis 2, Efthimis Rentzias 14, Georgios Karagkoutis 3. 

TEAM USA: (Coach: Dragan Šakota): Byron Dinkins 20, Melvin Cheatum 4, Xavier McDaniel 12, Buck Johnson 2, Richard Rellford 21, Lucius Davis 8, Mitchell Wiggins 12, Priest Lauderdale 1, Dominique Wilkins 19, Dean Garrett 12, José Ortiz 5, Lawrence Funderburke 4, Anthony Pelle 2. 

5th All-Star Game 1996–97:
DATE: 14 December 1996 (II) 
VENUE: Alexandreio Melathron  
SCORE: Europe - USA 83–75  

TEAM EUROPE: (Coaches: Giannis Ioannidis / Vangelis Alexandris): Angelos Koronios, Jure Zdovc 5, Panagiotis Liadelis 2, Nikos Chatzis 1, Georgios Sigalas 13, Peja Stojaković 20, Fragiskos Alvertis 9, Nikos Oikonomou 12, Dinos Angelidis, Panos Fasoulas 12, Efthimis Rentzias 4, Giannis Giannoulis, Dimitris Papanikolaou 4, Lefteris Kakiousis 1. 

TEAM USA: (Coaches: Kostas Missas / Kostas Petropoulos): Alphonso Ford 7, Harold Ellis 11, Byron Dinkins 6, "Dollar "Bill" Edwards, Marlon Maxey 8, Victor Alexander 6, Anthony Bonner 4, Keith Gatlin 4, Andrés Guibert 4, Melvin Cheatum 5, Eric Riley 2, John Hudson.

6th All-Star Game 1997–98:
DATE: November 22, 1997 
VENUE: EAK Patras 
SCORE: Europe - USA 127–108 

TEAM EUROPE: (Coach: Giannis Ioannidis): Dragan Tarlać 2, Artūras Karnišovas 32, Nikos Vetoulas, Peja Stojaković 30, Dinos Angelidis 6, Nasos Galakteros 2, Angelos Koronios, Fragiskos Alvertis 12, Alexis Papadatos, Giannis Giannoulis 3, Nikos Chatzis 22, Dušan Vukčević 9, Panagiotis Liadelis (DNP) 

TEAM USA: (Coach: Kostas Diamantopoulos): Willie Anderson 5, Samir Gouda 4, Scotty Thurman 8, José Ortiz 9, Byron Scott 29, Michael Hawkins 3, Frankie King 7, Conner Henry 3, Marlon Maxey 17, Brooks Thompson 17, Dyron Nix 3, Antonio Harvey 8.

7th All-Star Game 1998–99:
DATE: November 21, 1998  
VENUE: OAKA  
SCORE: Europe - USA 124–114  

TEAM EUROPE: (Coaches: Soulis Markopoulos / Kostas Petropoulos): Fragiskos Alvertis 8, Nikos Chatzis 14, Arijan Komazec 20, Dimitris Papanikolaou 13, Georgios Sigalas 9, Georgios Balogiannis 4, Dejan Bodiroga 9, Nikos Oikonomou 9, Dragan Tarlać 11, Claudio Coldebella 12, Anatoly Zourpenko 2, Mikhail Mikhailov 13. 

TEAM USA (Coaches: Zvi Sherf / Argyris Pedoulakis): Andy Toolson 13, Anthony Goldwire 26, Shane Heal 13, Derrick Dial 6, Joe Arlauckas 12, Buck Johnson, Alphonso Ford 4, Frankie King 3, Antonio Harvey 4, Mikki Moore 9, Erik Meek 8, Alvin Sims 17.

8th All-Star Game 1999–00:
DATE: November 20, 1999 
VENUE: OAKA 
SCORE: Europe - USA 119–118 

TEAM EUROPE: (Coaches: Giannis Ioannidis / Georgios Zevgolis): Angelos Koronios, Oded Kattash 26, Nikos Chatzis 6, Dimitris Papanikolaou 11, Panagiotis Liadelis 16, Claudio Coldebella 1, Dejan Bodiroga 19, Johnny Rogers 7, Giannis Giannoulis 13, Dimos Dikoudis 9, Michalis Kakiouzis 10. 

TEAM USA: (Coaches: Dragan Šakota / Andrea Mazzon): Shane Heal 2, Anthony Bowie 19, Henry Turner 6, Byron Dinkins 9, Robinson 9, Alphonso Ford 1, Ashraf Amaya 12, Reeves 10, "Dollar Bill" Edwards 27, James Forrest 19, Andrés Guibert 6, Buck Johnson.

9th All-Star Game 2000–01:
DATE: January 20, 2001  
VENUE: EAK Patras  
SCORE: Greece - World 86–85  

TEAM GREECE: (Coaches: Argyris Pedoulakis / Kostas Flevarakis): Fragiskos Alvertis 17, Georgios Kalaitzis 2, Thodoris Papaloukas 10, Dimitris Papanikolaou 13, Georgios Sigalas 3, Georgios Diamantopoulos 6, Dimos Dikoudis 11, Kostas Tsartsaris 5, Lazaros Papadopoulos 9, Christos Tapoutos 6, Nikos Chatzivrettas 2, Michalis Pelekanos (DNP) 

WORLD TEAM: (Coaches: Ilias Zouros / Georgios Zevgolis): Vrbica Stefanov 5, Buck Johnson 14, İbrahim Kutluay 1, Risase 10, Byron Dinkins 7, Oliver 9, Dušan Vukčević 17,  Ashraf Amaya 10, Anatoly Zourpenko, Vladimir Petrović-Stergiou 3, Williams 9.

10th All-Star Game 2001–02:
DATE: February 16, 2002 
SCORE: World - Greece 126–125 
VENUE: Dimitris Krachtidis Indoor Hall 

TEAM GREECE: (Coaches: Panagiotis Giannakis / Nikos Pavlou): Christos Charissis 17, Sdrakas 2, Thodoris Papaloukas 2, Dimitris Papanikolaou 7, Georgios Sigalas 5, Nikos Chatzivrettas 11, Georgios Diamantopoulos 4, Kostas Tsartsaris 2, Dimos Dikoudis 18, Fragiskos Alvertis 16, Lazaros Papadopoulos 17, Michalis Kakiouzis 21, Dimitris Diamantidis 3. 

WORLD TEAM: (Coaches: Željko Obradović, Dragan Šakota): Laurent Sciarra 3, İbrahim Kutluay 16, Dejan Bodiroga 11, Oliver 3, J.R. Holden 22, Carr 10, Alphonso Ford 8, Torraye Braggs 24, Nolan 21, Ryan Lorthridge 8.

11th All-Star Game 2002–03:
DATE: March 30, 2003  
SCORE: Greece - World 115–110  
VENUE: Kanithou Indoor Hall  

TEAM GREECE: (Coaches: Panagiotis Giannakis / Vangelis Alexandris): Christos Charissis 10, Georgios Kalaitzis, Dimitris Diamantidis 7, Dimitris Papanikolaou, Nikos Oikonomou 11, Fragiskos Alvertis 8, Georgios Diamantopoulos 26, Dimos Dikoudis 15, Nestoras Kommatos 5, Lazaros Papadopoulos 2, Michalis Pelekanos 2, Antonis Fotsis 29. 

WORLD TEAM: (Coaches: Bane Prelević / Argyris Pedoulakis): Benermann 6, Larry Ayuso 13, Jaka Lakovič, Iñaki de Miguel 8, İbrahim Kutluay 17, Mo Evans 13, Tyrone Nesby 22, Jones 4, Ryan Stack, Alibegovic 10, Ben Handlogten 8, Andrew Betts 9.

12th All-Star Game 2003–04:
DATE: March 28, 2004  
SCORE: Greece - World 102–89  
VENUE: Nea Ionia Indoor Hall  

TEAM GREECE: (Coaches: Panagiotis Giannakis / Lefteris Kakiousis): Georgios Kalaitzis 7, Nikos Chatzivrettas 8, Christos Tapoutos 2, Nestoras Kommatos 22, Nikos Chatzis 6, Panagiotis Liadelis 8, Dimitris Diamantidis 9, Kostas Tsartsaris, Giannis Giannoulis 12, Lazaros Papadopoulos 14, Andreas Glyniadakis 2, Fragiskos Alvertis. 

WORLD TEAM: (Coaches: Bane Prelević, Burton): Damir Mulaomerović 15, Roderick Blakney 8, Jenkins, Toby Bailey 6, Thomas 3, Ryan Stack 4, Smush Parker 8, Douglas 12, Pete Mickeal 13, Clark 4, Dalibor Bagarić 8, Watson 8, Powell.

13th All-Star Game 2004–05:
DATE: April 10, 2005  
SCORE: Greece - World 77–76  
VENUE: EAK Patras  

TEAM GREECE: (Coaches: Panagiotis Giannakis / Fotis Katsikaris): Nikos Zisis 2, Vassilis Spanoulis 6, Christos Charissis, Kostas Vasileiadis 8, Dimitris Diamantidis 2, Nikos Chatzis 5, Nikos Barlos 18, Nikos Oikonomou 5, Kostas Tsartsaris 9, Panos Vasilopoulos 12, Fragiskos Alvertis 3, Sofoklis Schortsanitis. 

WORLD TEAM: (Coaches: Željko Obradović / Bane Prelević): Damir Mulaomerović 6, Jaka Lakovič, Ibrahim Kutluay, Collins 14, Trent 4, Travis Watson 13, Nicevic 3, Toby Bailey 8, Ryan Stack 3, Andre Hutson 6, Pete Mickeal 11, Mike Batiste 8.

14th All-Star Game 2005–06:
DATE: February 26, 2006  
SCORE: Greece - World 97–97  
VENUE: Neapolis Indoor Hall  

TEAM GREECE: (Coaches: Željko Obradović / Vangelis Alexandris): Ioannis Gagaloudis 9, Vassilis Spanoulis 9, Dimitris Papanikolaou 20, Kostas Vasileiadis 9, Loukas Mavrokefalidis, Fragiskos Alvertis 3, Nikos Oikonomou 4, Kostas Tsartsaris 4, Dimitris Diamantidis 5, Ioannis Bourousis 8, Sofoklis Schortsanitis 20. 

WORLD TEAM: (Coaches: Jonas Kazlauskas / Argyris Pedoulakis): Damir Mulaomerović 17, Tyus Edney 4, Jaka Lakovič 3, Stewart 4, Lewis 10, Mike Batiste 9, Ante Žižić 2, Nikolay Padius 11, Terrell Castle 12, Ryan Stack 9, Bryan Bracey 16.

15th All-Star Game 2006–07:
DATE: Feb. 4, 2007 
SCORE: World - Greece 99–87 
VENUE: Lamia Indoor Hall 

TEAM GREECE: (Coaches: Željko Obradović / Kostas Pilafidis): Fragiskos Alvertis, Dimitris Diamantidis 18, Manos Papamakarios 3, Stratos Perperoglou 8, Georgios Printezis 7, Ioannis Bourousis 10, Savvas Iliadis 9, Dimos Dikoudis 8, Kostas Tsartsaris 4, Panos Vasilopoulos 2, Giannis Kalampokis 8, Sofoklis Schortsanitis 10. 

WORLD TEAM: (Coaches: Pini Gershon / Andrea Mazzon): Smush Parker 7, Skills 4, Alex Acker 10, Sani Bečirovič 13, Ramunas Siskauskas 8, Jeremiah Massey 8, Clark 9, Walsh 10, Wilkinson 2, Kennedy Winston 6, Ryan Stack 6, Andre Hutson 16.

16th All-Star Game 2007–08:
DATE: 12 April 2008  
SCORE: World - Greece 111–101  
VENUE: Amaliada Ilida Indoor Hall  

TEAM GREECE: (Coaches: Panagiotis Giannakis / Thanasis Skourtopoulos): Georgios Printezis 3, Dimitris Verginis 6, Vassilis Spanoulis 14, Stratos Perperoglou 6, Panos Vasilopoulos 10, Dimitris Diamantidis 13, Dimitris Tsaldaris 8, Dimos Dikoudis 9, Kostas Tsartsaris 8, Georgios Tsiaras 2, Ioannis Bourousis 18, Giannis Giannoulis 4. 

WORLD TEAM: (Coaches: Željko Obradović / Gordie Herbert): Anthony Grundy 5, Mike Batiste 4, Wright 3, Klimavicius 9, Jeremiah Massey, 19 Jeremy Gisev 7, Brad Newley 2, Kennedy Winston 9, Qyntel Woods 28, C 14.

17th All-Star Game 2008–09:
DATE: March 15, 2009  
SCORE: Greece - World 127–93  
VENUE: Filippos Amoridis Indoor Hall  

TEAM GREECE: (Coaches: Panagiotis Giannakis / Ioannis Sfairopoulos): Thodoris Papaloukas 18, Antonis Fotsis 11, Ioannis Bourousis 23, Panos Vasilopoulos 11, Stratos Perperoglou 6, Dimitris Tsaldaris 2, Kostas Papanikolaou 2, Vassilis Spanoulis 11, Loukas Mavrokefalidis 12, Dimitris Diamantidis 14, Andreas Glyniadakis 14. 

WORLD TEAM: (Coaches: Željko Obradović / Andrea Mazzon): Sarunas Jasikevicius 3, Anthony Grundy 2, Mike Batiste 17, Nikola Peković 8, Bryant 8, Bryant M, K , Nikolas 7, Nikola Vujčić 10, Lynn Greer 9, Jannero Pargo 5.

18th All-Star Game 2009–10:
DATE: March 14, 2010  
SCORE: Greece - World 147–114  
VENUE: Heraklion Indoor Arena  

TEAM GREECE: (Coaches: Georgios Bartzokas / Ilias Zouros): Makis Nikolaidis 13, Sofoklis Schortsanitis 42, Lazaros Papadopoulos 8, Thodoris Papaloukas 13, Kostas Kaimakoglou 13, Antonis Fotsis 10, Ian Vougioukas 9, Manos Papamakarios 15, Kostas Charalampidis 8, Giannis Kalampokis, Michalis Pelekanos 16, Vassilis Spanoulis (DNP). 

WORLD TEAM: (Coaches: David Blatt / Nenad Marković): Harris 2, Nikola Peković, Zoran Erceg 6, Francis 15, Miloš Teodosić 7, Drew Nicholas 16, Josh Childress 8, Linas Kleiza, Mike Batiste 17, Marcus Haislip 4, Jamon Gordon 13, Miles, Gregor 10

19th All-Star Game 2010–11:

DATE: March 13, 2011 
SCORE: Greece - World 141–122 
VENUE: Pyrgos Indoor Hall 

TEAM GREECE: (Coaches: Vangelis Alexandris /  Ioannis Sfairopoulos): Ian Vougioukas 6, Pat Calathes 24, Loukas Mavrokefalidis 22, Dimitris Diamantidis 13, Vassilis Spanoulis 8, Nick Calathes 11, Kostas Kaimakoglou 4, Antonis Fotsis 18, Makis Nikolaidis 11, Kostas Charissis 15, Stratos Perperoglou 4, Nikos Barlos 5, Thodoris Papaloukas (DNP).  

WORLD TEAM: (Coaches: Željko Obradović / Dimitris Priftis): Smith 13, Zoran Erceg 4, Rasho Nesterović 6, Miloš Teodosić 7, Palace 3, Mike Batiste 14, Lonny Baxter 20, Cedric Simmons 4, Marshall 11, Thompson 12.

20th All-Star Game 2012–13:

DATE: March 10, 2013  
SCORE: World - Greece 131–125  
VENUE: Perivola Indoor Hall  

TEAM GREECE: (Coaches: Argyris Pedoulakis / Soulis Markopoulos): Kostas Charalampidis 2, Vlado Janković 4, Mike Bramos, Nikos Pappas 10, Kostas Sloukas 2, Kostas Papanikolaou 15, Lazaros Papadopoulos 24, Dimitris Diamantidis 6, Georgios Printezis 11, Vassilis Spanoulis 7, Michalis Tsairelis 4, Sofoklis Schortsanitis (DNP), Giannis Antetokounmpo 8, Thanasis Antetokounmpo 18. 

WORLD TEAM: (Coaches: Georgios Bartzokas / Ioannis Sfairopoulos): Terrell Stoglin 12, Hunt 9, Errick McCollum 13, Jonas Mačiulis, Landon Milbourne 10, Roko Ukić 18, Acie Law 6, Stephane Lasme 4, Grant 6, James Gist 12, Brent Petway 26, Kyle Hines.

21st All-Star Game 2013–14:

DATE: March 10, 2014 
SCORE: Greece - World 123–122 
VENUE: Chania Indoor Hall 

TEAM GREECE: (Coaches: Soulis Markopoulos / Georgios Kalafatakis): Vangelis Mantzaris, Nikos Pappas 24, Mike Bramos 18, Ioannis Athinaiou 17, Stratos Perperoglou, Antonis Fotsis 7, Georgios Printezis, Loukas Mavrokefalidis 15, Dimitris Diamantidis 5, Michalis Tsairelis 12, Vassilis Kavvadas 8, Georgios Bogris 17, Vassilis Spanoulis (DNP). 
WORLD TEAM: (Coaches: Georgios Bartzokas / Ioannis Sfairopoulos): Errick McCollum 14, Brown 11, Ewin 16, D.J. Cooper 6, Jonas Maciulis 12, Matt Lojeski 13, Ivan Aska 2, Bryant Dunston 2, Stephane Lasme 17, James Gist 2, D.J. Stephens 19, Jason Hart 18.

22nd All-Star Game 2017–18:

DATE: February 11, 2018 
SCORE: World - Greece 144–137  
VENUE: EAK Patras 

TEAM GREECE: (Coaches: Xavi Pascual / Ilias Papatheodorou): Nick Calathes 11, Vassilis Spanoulis 12, Georgios Printezis 14, Nikos Pappas 17, Vassilis Kavvadas 8, Thanasis Antetokounmpo 22, Nikos Gkikas 9, Lefteris Bochoridis 15, Kostas Papanikolaou 8, Antonis Koniaris 6, Vangelis Margaritis 13, Ian Vougioukas 2, Panos Vasilopoulos (DNP). 
WORLD: (Coaches: Ioannis Sfairopoulos / Panagiotis Giannakis): Jason Hart 21, Moore 25, Chris Singleton 8, Milan Milošević 11, Nikola Milutinov 6, Thad McFadden 16, Langston Hall 9, Janis Strelnieks 6, K.C. Rivers 12, James Gist 12, Jamel McLean. 

23rd All-Star Game 2018–19:

DATE: February 10, 2019  
SCORE: World - Greece 149–146  
VENUE: Alexandreio Melathron 

GREECE: (Coaches: Rick Pitino / Argyris Pedoulakis): Nick Calathes, Vassilis Spanoulis 3, Linos Chrysikopoulos 4, Lefteris Bochoridis 16, Giannoulis Larentzakis 10, Georgios Printezis 7, Thanasis Antetokounmpo 39, Kostas Papanikolaou 17, Ioannis Papapetrou 15, Panos Vasilopoulos 4, Georgios Bogris 12, Georgios Papagiannis 22. 
WORLD: (Coaches: David Blatt / Luca Banchi ): Nigel Williams-Goss 10, Sean Kilpatrick 17, Janis Strelnieks 23, Axel Toupane 16, Jonas Maciulis 6, Nikola Milutinov 2, Danny Agbelese 12, William Hatcher 5, Jordan 12

24th All-Star Game 2019–20:

DATE: February 9, 2020 
SCORE: Team Maciulis - Team Calathes 109–104  
VENUE: Heraklion Indoor Arena 

TEAM CALATHES: (Coaches: Ilias Papatheodorou / Sotiris Manolopoulos): Conner Frankamp 9, Ras 12, Tomas 15, Nick Calathes 6, Vassilis Kavvadas 8, Dimitris Katsivelis 2, Nikos Pappas 5, Vangelis Mantzaris 6, K. Brown 3, Filler 14, Stephen Gray 2, Panos Filippakos 6, Jacob Wiley 4, Samardo Samuels 12, Sofoklis Schortsanitis. 
TEAM MACIULIS:  (Coaches: Makis Giatras / Vangelis Ziagkos): Jimmer Fredette 9, Tyrese Rice 6, Jonas Maciulis 11, Danny Agbelese 6, Dinos Mitoglou 19, Kostas Papadakis, Bobby Brown 6, Olivier Hanlan 12, Charis Giannopoulos 6, Lefteris Bochoridis 10, Vangelis Karampoulas 9, Marcus Slaughter 4, Loukas Mavrokefalidis 2, Georgios Papagiannis 9.

25th All-Star Game 2022–23:DATE: December 18, 2022 SCORE: Team Vezenkov - Team Papagiannis 137–112  VENUE: OAKA TEAM VEZENKOV: (Coaches: Georgios Bartzokas / Ioannis Kastritis): Vassilis Toliopoulos 3, Nikos Gkikas 18, Thomas Walkup 8, Nate Wolters 6, Yannick Franke 4, Omer Netzipoglou 6, Dimitris Agravanis 20, Sasha Vezenkov 18, Akil Mitchell 19, Moustapha Fall 21, Charis Giannopoulos 12, Paris Lee 0.TEAM PAPAGIANNIS''': (Coaches: Vassilis Spanoulis / Dejan Radonjić): Kostas Sloukas 0, Marcus Denmon 11, Giannoulis Larentzakis 12, JD Notae 24, Kostas Papanikolaou 5, Dwayne Bacon 12, Derrick Williams 6, Panos Kalaitzakis 0, Loukas Mavrokefalidis 5, Arnoldas Kulboka 14, Cameron McGriff 2, Georgios Papagiannis 21.

Players with 5 or more All-Star appearances (1991–2022)

Slam Dunk and Three Point contests

Slam Dunk Contest winners

3-Point Shootout Contest winners

Rising Stars versus All-Time Stars
The Rising Stars versus the All-Time Stars, is the all-star game that is played between players from the Greek basketball leagues that are ages 22 and under, and retired former professional Greek players. The first game was played on February 10, 2018. The game is played over the same all-star weekend as the regular Greek All-Star Game, and is played at the same arena as well.

Rising Stars versus All-Time Stars results

HEBA Greek Youth All-Star Game
The HEBA Greek Hopes, or Youth All-Star Game of basketball, was the all-star game that was played by players from the Greek basketball leagues that were ages 20 and under. The first Hopes game was played on March 29, 2003. The Youth All-Star Game was played over the same all-star weekend as the regular Greek All-Star Game, and was played at the same arena as well.

The game was considered as analogous to the NBA's All-Star Weekend Rising Stars Challenge. There are also the Greek Youth 3 Point Shootout Competition and the Greek Youth Slam Dunk Contest, for Greek players that are ages 20 and under.

Youth Under-20 All-Star Game results

Youth Under-22 3 Point Shootout Contest winners

Youth Under-22 Slam Dunk Contest winners

See also
Greek Basket League
Greek A2 Basket League
Greek Cup
Greek Super Cup
HEBA

Notes

References

Sources
Sports.e-go.gr Greek All Star Game Slam Dunk Contest Winners 
Sport24.gr  Greek All Star Game 3 Point Shootout Contest Winners

External links
Greek All Star Game Official Site 
History of The Greek All Star Game 

Basketball all-star games
Basketball competitions in Greece
Greek Basket League